The Eurodisplay SR-01 Magic is a Czech ultralight and light-sport aircraft, designed and produced by Eurodisplay of Kozomín. The aircraft is supplied as a kit for amateur construction or as a complete ready-to-fly-aircraft.

The company seems to have gone out of business in mid-2016 and production ended.

Design and development
The SR-01 was designed to comply with the Fédération Aéronautique Internationale microlight rules and US light-sport aircraft rules. It features a swept cantilever low-wing, a two-seats-in-tandem enclosed cockpit under a bubble canopy, fixed, or optionally retractable, tricycle landing gear and a single engine in tractor configuration. The tandem arrangement was chosen to provide military trainer-like seating.

The aircraft is made from sheet aluminum. Standard engines available are the  Rotax 912UL, the  Rotax 912ULS and the  Rotax 914 four-stroke powerplants.

Variants
SR-01 Magic UL ProTrainer
Version for the European market with a gross weight of 
SR-01 Magic LSA ProTrainer
Version for the US light-sport market with a gross weight of

Specifications (SR-01 Magic UL ProTrainer)

References

External links

2000s Czech ultralight aircraft
Homebuilt aircraft
Light-sport aircraft
Single-engined tractor aircraft